In mathematics, an overring B of an integral domain A is a subring of the field of fractions K of A that contains A: i.e., . For instance, an overring of the integers is a ring in which all elements are rational numbers, such as the ring of dyadic rationals.

A typical example is given by localization: if S is a multiplicatively closed subset of A, then the localization S−1A is an overring of A. The rings in which every overring is a localization are said to have the QR property; they include the Bézout domains and are a subset of the Prüfer domains. In particular, every overring of the ring of integers arises in this way; for instance, the dyadic rationals are the localization of the integers by the powers of two.

References

Ring theory